Live at the Meadowlands is a 2009 live album by the American singer Frank Sinatra, of a 1986 concert at the Meadowlands Arena in East Rutherford, New Jersey.

Housed in a striking package and presented with a 24-page collectors' book of rare photos and extensive notes by long-time Sinatra associate Hank Cattaneo, this previously unreleased recording features 21 digitally remastered songs on one compact disc.

Track listing
 Overture: "My Way"/"I Get a Kick out of You"/"Young at Heart"/"Nancy (With the Laughing Face)"/"There Are Such Things"/"High Hopes"/"I've Got You Under My Skin"/"My Kind of Town"/"All the Way"/"Strangers in the Night" (Paul Anka, Claude François, Jacques Revaux, Gilles Thibault)/(Cole Porter)/(Johnny Richards, Carolyn Leigh)/(Jimmy Van Heusen, Phil Silvers)/(Stanley Adams, Abel Baer, George W. Meyer)/(Sammy Cahn, Van Heusen)/(Porter)/(Cahn, Van Heusen)/(Cahn, Van Heusen)/(Bert Kaempfert, Charles Singleton, Eddie Snyder) – 3:40
 "Without a Song" (Edward Eliscu, Billy Rose, Vincent Youmans) – 4:12
 "Where or When" (Lorenz Hart, Richard Rodgers) – 3:40
 "For Once in My Life" (Ron Miller, Orlando Murden) – 2:48
 "Nice 'n' Easy" (Alan Bergman, Marilyn Bergman, Lew Spence) – 3:00
 "My Heart Stood Still" (Hart, Rodgers) – 3:14
 "Change Partners" (Irving Berlin) – 3:44
 "It Was a Very Good Year" (Ervin Drake) – 4:51
 "You Make Me Feel So Young" (Mack Gordon, Josef Myrow) – 3:06
 "The Gal That Got Away" (Harold Arlen, Ira Gershwin) – 4:23
 "Theme from New York, New York" (Fred Ebb, John Kander) – 4:11
 Monologue – 3:02
 "Come Rain or Come Shine" (Arlen, Johnny Mercer) – 3:43
 "Bewitched, Bothered and Bewildered" (Hart, Rodgers) – 3:36
 "Moonlight in Vermont" (Karl Suessdorf, John Blackburn) – 3:53
 "L.A. Is My Lady" (A. Bergman, M. Bergman, Quincy Jones, Peggy Lipton Jones) – 3:06
 "I've Got You Under My Skin" – 4:42
 "Someone to Watch Over Me" (George Gershwin, I. Gershwin) – 3:09
 "One for My Baby (and One More for the Road)" (Arlen, Mercer) – 5:48
 "Mack the Knife" (Marc Blitzstein, Bertolt Brecht, Kurt Weill) – 4:20
 "New York Bows (Theme from New York, New York)" – 1:18

Personnel
 Frank Sinatra – vocals
 Bill Miller – piano, conductor
 Tony Mottola – guitar
 Don Baldini – double bass
 Irving Cottler – drums
 Anthony Gorruso - Lead Trumpet

References

Frank Sinatra live albums
Live albums published posthumously
2009 live albums
Albums conducted by Bill Miller (pianist)
Concord Records live albums